Eugenia floccosa is a species of plant in the family Myrtaceae. It is endemic to India.  It is threatened by habitat loss.

References

Endemic flora of India (region)
floccosa
Endangered plants
Taxonomy articles created by Polbot